Baiyangdian railway station is a station Tianjin–Baoding intercity railway in Rongcheng County, Xiong'an New Area, Baoding, Hebei. The station is named after the Baiyangdian (Baiyang Lake).

History 
The station was opened on 28 December 2015, together with the Tianjin–Baoding intercity railway.

References 

Railway stations in Hebei
Stations on the Tianjin–Baoding Intercity Railway
Railway stations in China opened in 2015